From the Mars Hotel is the seventh studio album (eleventh overall) by rock band the Grateful Dead. It was mainly recorded in April 1974, and originally released June 27, 1974. It was the second album by the band on their own Grateful Dead Records label. From the Mars Hotel came less than one year after their previous album, Wake of the Flood, and was the last before the band's then-indefinite hiatus from live touring, begun in October 1974.

Recording
The Grateful Dead returned to the studio at the end of March 1974, having readied another batch of songs. The majority were again composed by lead guitarist Jerry Garcia and lyricist Robert Hunter and featured Garcia's lead vocals. However, "Pride of Cucamonga" and "Unbroken Chain" were both written and sung by bassist Phil Lesh with the assistance of poet Bobby Petersen. This was the only time he would sing two songs on a Dead studio album, and they would be his final lead vocal work for the band until 1985. Rhythm guitarist Bob Weir contributed "Money Money" with writing partner John Perry Barlow.
 
The band chose to return to Coast Recorders on Folsom Street in San Francisco, where they had recorded "The Golden Road (To Unlimited Devotion)" as a single for their first album, in 1967. The studio had since been purchased by CBS Studios and refurbished. They produced the album themselves with engineer Roy Segal. According to Segal, Garcia liked the room because it had a more "live" sound than the Record Plant, where the band had recorded their previous album. Garcia had played in CBS Studios earlier in the year with Art Garfunkel during the sessions for Angel Clare.

Many of the Garcia-Hunter songs had been played live for up to a year or more. "U.S. Blues" had started life as "Wave That Flag" in February 1973 before being dropped and heavily rewritten; however, "Scarlet Begonias" had been introduced only in the month prior to recording. Weir's "Money Money" was arranged in the studio. A separate version of "China Doll" (also introduced in February 1973) was recorded for the previous album Wake of the Flood, but not used. Lesh had recorded demo versions of his two tracks during sessions for that album. Though Garcia had played pedal steel for the band, John McFee (of Clover) guests on the instrument for "Pride of Cucamonga". Electronic composer Ned Lagin (who frequently sat in during the group's live performances between 1970 and 1975) played synthesizer on "Unbroken Chain".

As previously, the band felt stifled by studio confines. Commenting later about the sessions, drummer Bill Kreutzmann said "The studio felt contrived. It couldn’t offer the freedom of playing something live, nor the satisfaction."

While recording the album, the Grateful Dead were testing a massive touring P.A. system called The Wall of Sound. A contemporaneous test performance of the sound system was released as Dick's Picks Volume 24.

Release
The album's cover art was created by Kelley/Mouse, who had previously created artwork for the band's American Beauty, Grateful Dead, and Europe '72 albums. The front depicts an actual San Francisco building, juxtaposed in an extraterrestrial landscape. The real Mars Hotel was a derelict flophouse, at 192 Fourth Street, that had been the temporary residence of Jack Kerouac and was previously used as a location in David Bowie's promotional film for "The Jean Genie". It was demolished during the Yerba Buena redevelopmentfootage of which is seen in The Grateful Dead Movieand is now the site of the Moscone West Exhibition Hall. In competing against existing distribution channels, albums on the Grateful Dead label became subject to counterfeiting. In response, and to help consumers recognize higher-quality, official pressings, the word "authentic" was embossed in a vertical column on the left margin of the cover.

The working title for the album was "Ugly Roomers". Kreutzmann said it was "a self-deprecating dig at ourselves, but we changed it to 'rumors' out of respect to the boarders at the hotel." After another title change to From the Mars Hotel, the punning spelling "Ugly Rumors" was retained in stylized Aztecan text on the front cover, as rotated mirror writing.

The rear cover depicts the band as the "ugly roomers", in the guise of cartoon characters lounging in a room in outer space, watching television. Lesh wears a pharaonic nemes, Garcia a space helmet and Kreutzmann a galea. Weir is a space-clown marked with a "Z". Keyboardist Keith Godchaux bears a halo of lightning bolts and backing vocalist Donna Godchaux, who had recently become a mother, is depicted as a madonna. The image was created from a group photograph taken in the lounge of a hotel in the Tenderloin district.

An edit of "U.S. Blues" was released as a single (b/w "Loose Lucy").

Four of the songs from the album remained in live rotation throughout the band's existence. "Scarlet Begonias" in particular became an extended-jam highlight, later usually paired with a segue into "Fire on the Mountain," while "U.S. Blues" was a preferred encore. "Ship of Fools" and "China Doll" were played with less frequency. For many years, Deadhead lore maintained that "Unbroken Chain" would only be performed at the band's final concert; it was finally broken out on the band's penultimate tour in March 1995 and performed at their final concert on July 9, 1995. "Money Money" was played three times, in May 1974, and then dropped by the time of the album's release, as the perceived misogyny of the song was worrisome to certain band members. "Loose Lucy" was dropped after 1974 and resurrected in 1990. Only "Pride of Cucamonga" was never played live.

With the collapse of the band's label and the move to Arista Records, the album was out of print for many years. In 1984 an audiophile-quality pressing was released by Mobile Fidelity Records, using half-speed mastering. The album's first CD release was in 1985, and it has remained in print since a 1989 CD self-release by Grateful Dead Records. It was remastered and expanded as part of the Beyond Description (1973–1989) box set, in 2004. This version was released separately by Rhino Records, in 2006.

Critical reception 

Village Voice critic Robert Christgau wrote of the album: "Brighter and more uptempo than Wake of the Flood (which is not to claim it's 'high energy'), with almost as many memorable tunes as American Beauty. Robert Hunter is not progressing, however—even 'U.S. Blues,' an entertaining collection of conceits, seems received rather than found. And a Weir-Barlow song about money is just one more way for rich Marin hippies to put women down."

It was voted number 556 in the third edition of Colin Larkin's All Time Top 1000 Albums (2000).

Track listing

 Sides one and two were combined as tracks 1–8 on CD reissues.

Notes

Influence
While studying law at St John's College, Oxford, in the 1970s, Tony Blair (UK prime minister 1997–2007) helped found the rock band Ugly Rumours, as a singer-guitarist. The group was named for the mirror writing on the cover of From the Mars Hotel.

The group Animal Collective sampled "Unbroken Chain" for their song "What Would I Want? Sky", on their EP Fall Be Kind, receiving praise from Pitchfork Media and Sputnikmusic for their usage. It was the first sample ever cleared for use by the Grateful Dead.

Personnel

Grateful Dead
 Jerry Garcia – lead guitar, vocals, production
 Donna Jean Godchaux – vocals, production
 Keith Godchaux – keyboards, vocals, production
 Bill Kreutzmann – drums, production
 Phil Lesh – bass guitar, vocals, production
 Bob Weir – guitar, vocals, production

Additional musicians
 Ned Lagin – synthesizers on "Unbroken Chain"
 John McFee – pedal steel guitar on "Pride of Cucamonga"

Technical personnel
 Phil Brown – mastering
 Mary Ann Mayer – illustrations, creation

Reissue personnel
 James Austin – production
 Hugh Brown – design, art direction
 Reggie Collins – annotation
 Jimmy Edwards – associate production
 Sheryl Farber – editorial supervision
 Tom Flye – mixing
 Joe Gastwirt – mastering, production consultation
 Robert Gatley – mixing assistance
 Robin Hurley – associate production
 Eileen Law – research
 David Lemieux – production
 Hale Milgrim – associate production
 Scott Pascucci – associate production
 Richard Pechner – photography
 Ed Perlstein – photography
 Bruce Polonsky – photography
 Cameron Sears – executive production
 Roy Segal – engineering
 Joel Selvin – liner notes
 Steve Vance – design, reissue art direction

Chart positions
Billboard

References

External links
http://www.dead.net/tags/mars-hotel-0

1974 albums
Acid rock albums
Grateful Dead albums
Grateful Dead Records albums
Rhino Records albums